The Prime Time Access Rule (PTAR) was a broadcasting regulation that was instituted in the United States by the Federal Communications Commission (FCC) in 1970 to restrict the amount of network programming that a local television station either owned-and-operated or affiliated with a television network can air during evening primetime hours. This rule was repealed by the FCC in 1996, though remnants remain.

Issuance
The PTAR was issued in 1970 and was implemented at the beginning of the 1971–1972 television season (the week of September 13–19, 1971). It was re-examined periodically, and it underwent several modifications since its initial implementation.

The PTAR was instituted over a stated concern, by television-reform activists and other parties, that the three major television networks (ABC, CBS, and NBC) dominated the television program production market, controlled much of the programming presented to the public, and inhibited the development of competing program sources, especially independent syndicators and local stations. The FCC believed that PTAR would ultimately increase the level of competition in program production, reduce the networks' control over programming decisions made by their affiliates, and thereby increase the diversity of programs available to the public, especially in the evening hours when most households were watching.

To ensure that independent companies would have access, the Financial Interest and Syndication Rules (commonly known as "fin-syn") were instituted at the same time by the FCC. This prohibited networks from owning syndication arms. Networks that did operate existing syndication divisions were forced to divest them, converting them into new companies independent from network management (such as Viacom, which was originally created by CBS to distribute its content and eventually expanded outside of program syndication and distribution in the succeeding years after the spinoff).

Implementation
In surrendering time back to their affiliates, with fewer time slots available, networks issued a higher-than-normal number of cancellations in the summer of 1971. The networks, CBS in particular, disproportionately removed shows that were popular among rural and older audiences as part of their cancellations, a phenomenon known as the "rural purge", in an attempt to revamp their lineups to appeal more to younger viewers (i.e., Baby Boomers) with more disposable income and less product brand loyalty than older, non-metropolitan Americans, two things advertisers of the time strongly desired. (NBC took a somewhat different approach by expanding its late-night schedule in 1973, with The Midnight Special and Tomorrow. By 1975, Saturday Night Live was added.)

Initially, the ruling required the networks to cede one half-hour of their nightly programming to their affiliates (or owned-and-operated stations) in the 50 largest markets, Mondays through Saturdays, from 7:30 to 8 p.m. Eastern (6:30 to 7 Central), and a full hour on Sundays, between 7 and 7:30 p.m. (6 to 6:30 Central) and 10:30 to 11 p.m. (9:30 to 10 Central). Because it would have represented a large if not prohibitive loss of advertising exposure for the networks to have their programs excluded from the largest stations (and thus not reaching half or more of the U.S. population), the networks opted to relinquish those timeslots to all their stations, not just those required by the text of PTAR.

Beginning on September 13, 1971, local stations, other than those not affiliated with a network or in the public television system, had to fill that vacated time on their schedules. The FCC and supporters of the ruling had hoped, at least publicly, that stations would make every effort to air programs of either a public-affairs or educational orientation, particularly between 7:30 and 8 p.m. Mondays through Saturdays. All but the largest stations found that such programming would cost too much to produce and not bring in enough viewers, and thus revenue, to be viable (although the largest of stations attempted such programming, usually no more frequently than weekly), so most stations took one of two approaches. First, those outside the top 50 markets often decided, Mondays through Fridays, to carry reruns of popular 1960s sitcoms, especially those that appealed strongly to children and youth, which were usually the cheapest shows available on the market then. That strategy was forbidden by the FCC to stations in the top 50 category, so they, and numerous other stations underneath them in market rank, chose instead to run new, first-run syndicated versions of popular daytime game shows (which sometimes had different hosts to distinguish them from the network programs) such as Hollywood Squares and Let's Make a Deal, as well as versions of former network shows such as To Tell the Truth (Garry Moore version), Truth or Consequences (Bob Barker version), and Wild Kingdom. Depending on the frequency of their production, those shows were aired either on a nightly or weekly basis, the latter in a "checkerboard" pattern, with a different one each evening, to resemble the network primetime that they led into. Many of the game shows were distributed by companies that before 1971 had been subsidiaries owned by the networks (such as the former CBS property Viacom and former ABC property Worldvision Enterprises) and packaged by the same production companies at the same studios as their daytime counterparts. 

On Saturdays, different shows were usually run, especially hour-long versions of former network favorites such as Hee Haw and The Lawrence Welk Show, both of which had just been canceled by CBS and ABC, respectively. Still other stations, particularly in the South and rural Midwest, had success with half-hour country music shows, most of which were produced in Nashville, Tennessee, rather than Southern California or New York City. Sunday shows varied from station to station, with many in the Central Time Zone (6 p.m.) airing newscasts as they normally would Mondays through Saturdays. At 10:30/9:30 p.m., some stations did, in fact, air public affairs programming as the FCC wanted, because that timeslot marked a rapid decline in viewers from earlier in the evening (usually by them turning off the set and going to bed), making potential ad revenues from entertainment programming at that time much less, in turn removing the otherwise prohibitive risk. 

Regardless of the night of the week, the early evening programs had a proviso that they not portray violent, sexual, or profane content unsuitable to young viewers. The National Association of Broadcasters instituted this as a decree in conjunction with the family viewing hour networks were encouraged to program in the hour following access; this decree was ruled to have been made under illegal duress in fall 1976. Also, exceptions to the above were made for breaking (and occasional, not regular) network news coverage or local newscasts on weeknights, which some Central Time Zone broadcasters experimented with, at 6:30 p.m. local time, to varying degrees of success.

In PTAR's first season, the networks briefly programmed Tuesday nights from 7:30 to 10:30 p.m. (6:30 to 9:30 Central), but afterward, the 8 to 11 (7 to 10) standard was adopted uniformly Mondays through Saturdays. With exceptions as listed below, such remains the normal practice to this day.

Television critics almost uniformly denounced PTAR, holding that its stated aim to improve and diversify programming had backfired (i.e., the substituted programming basically circumvented the purpose of the ruling since most of the shows were not particularly original) due to economic realities, things they and others felt the FCC had not taken into consideration when enacting the regulation. Needless to say, the networks were not pleased with the results, either, believing the true motivation behind PTAR was nothing more than a plot by the Nixon Administration and its sympathizers in the FCC (and the U.S. Congress) to deprive them of ad revenues, as a political retaliation against their news divisions' generally adverse coverage of the White House's policies on the Vietnam War and against the social turbulence of the time. Also, ABC, CBS, and NBC were especially sensitive to declining ad sales due to the Federal Government's prohibition of broadcast cigarette advertising (with loopholes permitting other tobacco products to continue commercials until the 1980s) in January 1971, once a lucrative source of revenue, and the beginning of the recessions that would plague the next dozen years after that. As such, the networks resolved to agitate for either outright repeal of PTAR or to get back one or more nights per week of the time lost in 1971. The window of opportunity for that opened when Richard Nixon left office in 1974 due to the Watergate scandal. During that time, Nixon's animosity toward the American media was discredited due to revelations of his and his associates' abuse of power which, in turn, vindicated to many Americans (though not all) the critical stance the networks appeared to take toward him over the years. With a more media-friendly president, Gerald Ford, in office, and probably new appointees on the FCC, the networks thus gained leverage to attempt to restore their lost air time. In Ford's first year in office, it happened through a compromise.

Sunday night revision
While the networks hoped to have PTAR done away with entirely, their affiliates opposed such a move due to profitable local spot ad revenues on Mondays through Saturdays, so they settled for a revision by the FCC instead in 1975. That modification allowed networks to reclaim the hour on Sunday nights lost in 1971, from 7 to 11 p.m. (6 to 10 Central). Then as now, the night of the week with the largest potential audience was Sunday, due to competing forms of entertainment (e.g., movie theaters, nightclubs) being mostly closed on that night in much of the country because of long-standing religious-inspired blue laws, and the networks, if forced to choose only one day of the week for restoration, would certainly choose it. The Sunday return of network time came with one overweening condition: programs between 7 and 8 (6 to 7 Central) had to either have news/informational content or appeal primarily to a family audience with children, meaning that adult subject matter (especially sexuality and violence) was not permitted during that time period.

Beginning on September 14, 1975, CBS debuted a family drama, Three for the Road, at 7 p.m. That show ran only 12 episodes before being canceled. 60 Minutes, a news magazine that CBS had run in irregular timeslots since its inception in 1968, was designated as the replacement, beginning on December 7. By the end of the season in early 1976, it had become the top-rated program on Sunday nights, a highly-unusual occurrence at the time for a news-based broadcast. Its main competition in the early years was NBC's long-running The Wonderful World of Disney, which appealed to family viewers, having moved ahead a half-hour from 7:30 p.m., where it had aired from 1971 to 1975. By 1981, the ratings lead of 60 Minutes was so strong that NBC canceled Disney after a 20-year run there, with CBS picking it up for a Saturday-night slot that fall. ABC, and NBC after 1981, attempted numerous shows that made little or no impact upon the 60 Minutes stronghold on viewers in the late 1970s and 1980s.  

The 1990s brought some stability to the networks other than CBS. ABC has programmed America's Funniest Home Videos in the slot for much of the time since 1993 (except for a period from 1997 to 2002, when ABC broadcast The Wonderful World of Disney in the 7:00 p.m. hour, where NBC had carried it in the late 1970s), while CBS has shown 60 Minutes in the slot consistently since 1975 except on very rare occasions, usually years when CBS has the rights to the Super Bowl, which kicks off at approximately 6:30 p.m. (5:30 Central); prior to 1978, the contest aired on a Sunday afternoon in January. NBC has mostly broadcast Dateline NBC in the slot since 1996, though since regaining NFL broadcasting rights in 2006, during football season the network airs Football Night in America in the slot as a pre-game show to its NBC Sunday Night Football broadcasts. During most of the winter and spring, NBC (as well as ABC and FOX) has aired programming in this time slot that is not a news or information program (such as the aforementioned Dateline NBC).  Such programs are usually either re-edited versions of shows that normally would air in the 8–11 p.m. primetime slot, or theatrical films intended for family viewing (such as animated films). 

Even today, some networks still air aural and/or visual bumpers (i.e. "We'll return after these messages") in the 7/6 p.m. timeslot for younger viewers to understand the difference between a program and a commercial (as if the show aired on Saturday mornings)—such bumpers, one of the original requirements of the timeslot, are not required for news and information programs such as the aforementioned 60 Minutes, since those shows are mainly watched by an adult audience.

The slot has been used by the networks to broadcast run-over programming from NFL games, since the NFL broadcasting contracts require its games to air in their entirety (this happened as a result of the infamous "Heidi Game" in November 1968, in which NBC cut away from an Oakland Raiders-New York Jets game to air the television film Heidi, prior to a Raiders' comeback late in the fourth quarter). While CBS shifts its Sunday evening schedule to start after its NFL coverage concludes, Fox has utilized a different approach: the network completely preempted its lineup until the last game it held the right to broadcast in each region had finished until 2004, after which it joined its primetime lineup in progress (preempting portions or even the entirety of programs scheduled to air between 7 and 8 p.m. following the game's designated time slot).  Similarly, if necessary, major tournaments in professional golf are also treated in this manner; since 1987 (the year Daylight Saving Time was moved to an earlier start), the Masters Tournament has frequently not finished until that hour.  The U.S. Open and Men's PGA Championship, depending on the region, also can be overrun into the timeslot, with Pacific Time Zone tournaments allowing networks to run into well past 8 p.m.  

Since 2005, Fox has aired the post-game show, The OT, in the slot as filler programming between its NFL coverage and The Simpsons at 8 p.m., with its length depending on how late the final game ends, since NFL games with a 4:25 p.m. (Eastern) start time almost always end by 8 p.m., even if the game goes into overtime. Fox has continued the practice for Monster Energy NASCAR Cup Series races, as the Daytona 500 and on occasion, a West Coast Swing event such as the Auto Club Speedway round, was designed to creep into the 7 p.m. hour, and the U.S. Open, typically held on the Sunday closest to the longest day of the year, will also do such. Before that, the 7 p.m. hour on Fox was used similarly to that of the Friday night death slot on all of the networks, as several shows near the end of their runs (such as Malcolm in the Middle, Family Guy and Futurama) were assigned to air in the time period but ultimately got preempted by Fox's NFL coverage. This tradition has continued during the off-season, with the most recent examples of shows burned off on Sundays at the 7 p.m. half-hour being 'Til Death and Sons of Tucson during the spring and summer of 2010, and Mulaney in 2014.

On October 7, 2018, The CW resumed programming a primetime lineup on Sunday nights. Unlike its previous effort to program that night from the network's launch in September 2006 (a byproduct of originally adopting co-predecessor The WB's 30-hour weekly base schedule upon The CW's launch) until it ceded the timeslot to its affiliates in September 2009, The CW opted to only to offer programming during the "common prime" slot (8 to 10 pm. ET/PT) offered on weekdays and Saturdays by the conventional broadcast networks that have launched on U.S. television since Fox's expansion to include prime time program offerings in April 1987. This move marked the first such instance of a major U.S. television network not programming that hour since the 1975 PTAR revision was implemented.

Weekdays, 1980s
By the early 1980s, the weeknight PTAR slots had changed from a predominance of weekly game shows and feature programming and sitcom reruns (many in the latter category moving to independent stations), to nightly versions of games such as Family Feud and Tic Tac Dough and magazine-format programs such as the Group W-founded PM Magazine and Entertainment Tonight, launched in 1981 as the first-ever satellite-distributed nightly syndicated program. This transition bolstered viewer interest and station revenues, meaning that the networks were extremely reluctant to upset affiliate relations by attempting to scale back PTAR further.

1996 elimination
The PTAR was eliminated on August 30, 1996, the commission having determined it was "no longer necessary" as a tool to promote independent production or affiliate autonomy. The major networks did not reclaim the traditional access period in early primetime due to pressure from affiliates to retain control of one of the more profitable parts of their programming schedules. Several syndicated programs (such as Entertainment Tonight, Wheel of Fortune and Jeopardy!) are still broadcast in the "prime access hour", and have earned audiences equal to or greater than many network shows.

In 2010, Fox was allowed to present World Series games that started around 7:30 p.m. Eastern Time, presumably under the hope that games would not run into the 11:00 p.m. (Eastern) hour (though in practice, this still consistently occurs despite the early start). In 2014 and 2015, CBS moved its Thursday primetime to start at 7:30 p.m. for the first eight weeks of the season to allow for a full pregame show for Thursday Night Football, a move which was emulated for NBC and Fox's carriage of the same package.

Smaller networks such as Pax TV launched with full 24-hour schedules after the rule change. Some networks, though, had programmed the access hour even while the rule was still in effect, particularly Spanish-language networks that hold responsibility for the majority of their affiliates' programming schedules, such as Univision and Telemundo.

See also
 Schurz Communications, Inc. v. FCC
 Telecommunications Act of 1996, issued at the same time as PTAR was repealed

References

External links
 Museum of Broadcast Communications article on PTAR 

1970 establishments in the United States
1996 disestablishments in the United States
Television in the United States
Television terminology
Television syndication
Broadcast law